is a 2011 Japanese drama film directed by Ichirō Kita.

Cast
 Kazuko Yoshiyuki
 Megumi Saeki
 Miyoko Asada
 Hana Kino
 Takaaki Enoki
 Tetsuya Makita

References

External links
  
 

Films directed by Ichirō Kita
Japanese drama films
2011 drama films
2011 films
2010s Japanese films
2010s Japanese-language films